Li Baojin (born 2 November 1959) is a Chinese racewalker. He competed in the men's 20 kilometres walk at the 1988 Summer Olympics.

References

1959 births
Living people
Athletes (track and field) at the 1988 Summer Olympics
Chinese male racewalkers
Olympic athletes of China
Place of birth missing (living people)